Do You Want New Wave or Do You Want the Soft Pink Truth? is the second album by the Soft Pink Truth, a side-project of Drew Daniel of the electronic music duo Matmos.

This album consists of covers of various punk rock and hardcore bands from the 1970s and '80s. The album title itself is an allusion to the song title "Do You Want New Wave or Do You Want the Truth?" by the Minutemen from their Double Nickels on the Dime album. Only the last song is not a punk cover.

Track listing
 "Kitchen" (L. Voag) – 3:05 
 "Do They Owe Us a Living?" (Crass) – 4:43 
 "In School" (Die Kreuzen) – 1:07 
 "Media Friend/V.S.B." (Rudimentary Peni) – 4:57 
 "I Owe It to the Girls" (Teddy & the Frat Girls) – 3:13 
 "Out of Step" (Minor Threat) – 3:01 
 "Real Shocks" (Swell Maps) – 3:39 
 "Confession" (Nervous Gender) – 4:36
 "Homo-sexual" (Angry Samoans) – 3:08 
 "Lookin' Back" (Carol Channing) – 0:48

Personnel
 Drew Daniel – synthesizer, turntables, vocals, sampling, sequencers, CD players 
Extra musicians
Vicki Bennett – vocals
Blevin Blectum – vocals 
Martin C. Schmidt – synthesizer, Dumbek, vocals 
Jeremy Scott – vocals
Dani Siciliano – vocals
Technical staff
 Drew Daniel – editing, mixing
 Xopher Davidson – mastering
 Rex Ray – design

References

External links
 Do You Want New Wave or Do You Want the Soft Pink Truth? at Tigerbeat6

2004 albums
Covers albums
The Soft Pink Truth albums
Tigerbeat6 albums